Haddeland may refer to the following locations in Norway:

Haddeland, Agder, a village in Hægebostad municipality, Agder county
Haddeland, Telemark, a village in Vinje municipality, Vestfold og Telemark county

See also
Hadeland